"Room at the Bottom" is the sixth episode of the third series of the British comedy series Dad's Army that was originally transmitted on Thursday 16 October 1969.

Plot
Wilson is sitting at Mainwaring's desk, when Captain Bailey from GHQ arrives. He asks Wilson about how long Mainwaring has been in charge. Wilson says it was ever since they were Local Defence Volunteers. Bailey is surprised because there were no commissions in the LDV, and Wilson admits that Mainwaring made himself a captain. Bailey tells him that it's more ordinary to have a lieutenant in charge of a platoon, so Mainwaring must remove one of his pips. Wilson is delighted, and is even more delighted when Walker brings him his new hat: a beret.

Wilson, with some glee, practises what he is going to say to Mainwaring, who then arrives, announcing that he's recruited a Drill Sergeant for drill practice. Wilson tells him about Bailey's visit, but Mainwaring laughs it off. He rings GHQ and speaks to a sergeant, who knows nothing about it. He waits for Wilson's explanation, and concludes that Wilson is jealous of him, and that is the reason why he bought a beret. GHQ rings; Mainwaring answers, and is horrified to learn that Wilson was telling the truth. Wilson insists that he is sorry for Mainwaring, even though he is laughing in his face.

Godfrey sees Mainwaring removing his pips, offering to assist based on his former experience in tailoring, but is quickly dismissed by Mainwaring, who is determined to make sure nobody finds out, but Godfrey blabs to the rest of the platoon. Frazer, Jones and Walker wonder whether he's been promoted to major, though Walker hopes not, believing that Mainwaring is pompous enough already. When the parade is about to be dismissed, Mainwaring emerges from the office with a rubber tyre on his shoulders, covering up his badge of rank. Walker and Frazer point out that they can't salute Mainwaring unless they can see his rank. A reluctant Mainwaring is about to reveal the truth, when the Verger comes rushing in, announcing that the Bismarck has been sunk. The platoon cheer and Mainwaring quickly dismisses them, the Navy having "saved his bacon".

The next day, Captain Bailey returns and tells Wilson that Mainwaring hasn't even been commissioned as a lieutenant, and he must join the ranks. He adds that Wilson will be in charge for the time being. Bailey gives Wilson the news in an envelope and leaves via the main hall so as not to disturb the platoon's drilling. Mainwaring then arrives and opens the letter as Wilson quickly leaves the office. He hears a shot, and thinks Mainwaring has committed suicide. He rushes in and is joined by Jones, who explains that it was Godfrey's rifle that fired, and the two of them help a speechless Mainwaring into his chair.

Wilson commands the next parade and admits he will be leading them on the divisional scheme on Sunday. Mainwaring enters, wearing a private's uniform, nobly declaring that the protection of the town must come before pride. The platoon, particularly Jones and Godfrey, are saddened as he joins the ranks. Wilson calls the platoon to attention, but Mainwaring mistimes his drill, while Jones has improved. However, the roles are soon reversed.

Suddenly the pre-arranged Drill Sergeant Gregory turns up and immediately starts barking orders, insulting many members of the platoon. Mainwaring speaks up in their defence but, now as a private, is picked on for speaking out of turn. However, Gregory is soon given a taste of his own medicine when they practise sloping arms; Jones mucks it up, accidentally throwing his rifle on the Drill Sergeant's foot.

At the exercise Wilson does not make a good job of leadership. Jones volunteers to be the scout, but ants climb up his trousers and he has to take them off to get rid of them. Believing it's the signal to advance, the platoon move forward, but soon find themselves in an ambush. It is a disheartened platoon that heads back to Walmington. Sponge remarks there'll soon be no platoon for the new officer to take charge of. Therefore, the platoon decide to write to GHQ, asking for Mainwaring to be commissioned. In his letter, Walker offers a couple of bottles of scotch "if it will tip the balance". Frazer declines to write with his colleagues, instead writing at home and asking for promotion himself.

As a result of the letters, Mainwaring is reinstated and everything is back to normal... almost. He and Wilson then muse on the events of the past few days. When Wilson laughs at the fact that Mainwaring had had no authority whatsoever to command the platoon, the latter then shocks Wilson by saying that he, therefore, had had no authority to promote him to sergeant in the first place. Wilson realises what Mainwaring is implying, but the latter plays on the moment by saying that he was sure everything would be sorted out ... and then says nonchalantly, "Perhaps you'd like to borrow my penknife!" (to remove his sergeant's stripes).

Notes

According to the Verger's announcement, the first half of this episode must be set on 27 May 1941.
When Drill Sergeant Gregory asks Walker why he isn't in the army, he replies that he 'got his ticket' for being allergic to corned beef – a reference to the earlier episode The Loneliness of the Long Distance Walker.
A transition song in this episode is "This is Worth Fighting for" by Hutch.

Cast

Radio version

Notes
As mentioned above, there were only minor changes from the original TV episode, yet there is no scene in the radio episode at all depicting the battle exercise. The platoon did participate in it, though, since Frazer, when commenting about the plunging morale of the platoon on the night Mainwaring absented himself, he remarks bitterly on the fact that "Sergeant Wilson led us straight into an ambush!"

Cast
The surname of the character played by guest actor John Ringham was changed from Captain Bailey to Captain Turner, presumably because actor Michael Knowles, who co-adapted the TV episodes for radio with Harold Snoad, made occasional cameo appearances as "Captain Bailey", including in the radio episode, A Stripe for Frazer.

Colour restoration of the original television recording

This episode of Dad's Army, after its original broadcast on BBC One in October 1969 and repeat in May 1970, had only survived as a 16mm black-and-white film telerecording which had been transferred from the original colour videotape before that tape was wiped and reused for reasons of cost. In 2007 James Insell, a preservation specialist at the BBC Archive, established the Colour Recovery Working Group and in 2008 a new technique developed by member Richard Russell was used to restore the episode back to colour.

The technique relies on the fact that some black-and-white film recordings contain the original PAL colour sub-carrier recorded on each film frame as a pattern of fine "chroma dots" and the software is able to decode these back to colour. This process is completely different from the artificial colouring technique that was applied to some black-and-white films during the 1980s – with The Guardian describing the group's new descrambling process as "akin to turning an omelette back into an egg".

After being re-mastered with a high quality audio soundtrack, the resulting restored copy was as close to the episode's master recording as possible and is now kept as the official BBC Archive copy — this was broadcast again in colour for the first time since 1970 on Saturday 13 December 2008 on BBC Two, but has so far not been included in the DVD release of the complete collection, and only an early, partially restored colour version was available for purchase on the BBC Store.

References

Further reading

External links

Dad's Army radio episodes
Dad's Army (series 3) episodes
1969 British television episodes